John Payne (23 August 1842 – 11 February 1916) was an English poet and translator. Initially he pursued a legal career and had associated with Dante Gabriel Rossetti. Later he became involved with limited edition publishing and the Villon Society.

He is now best known for his translations of Boccaccio's Decameron, The Arabian Nights and the Diwan Hafez.

After completing his translation of Omar Khayyam, Payne returned to the rendition of Hafiz that was eventually published in 3 volumes. in 1901. Payne argues that Hafiz takes the "whole sweep of human experience and irradiates all things with his sun-gold and his wisdom".

Payne once said that Hafez, Dante and Shakespeare were the three greatest poets of the world.

Archives 
Papers of John Payne are held at the Cadbury Research Library, University of Birmingham.

Works

The Masque of Shadows and other poems (1870)
Intaglios; sonnets (1871)
Songs of Life and Death. (1872)
Lautrec: A Poem (1878)
The Poems of François Villon.(1878)
New Poems (1880)
The Book of the Thousand Nights and One Night (1882–4) translation in nine volumes
Tales from the Arabic (1884)
The Novels of Matteo Bandello, Bishop of Agen (1890) translation in six volumes
The Decameron by Giovanni Boccaccio (1886) translation in three volumes
Alaeddin and the Enchanted Lamp; Zein Ul Asnam and The King of the Jinn: (1889) editor and translator
The Persian Letters of Montesquieu (1897) translator
The Quatrains of Omar Kheyyam of Nisahpour (1898)
Poems of Master François Villon of Paris (1900)
The Poems of Shemseddin Muhammed Hafiz of Shiraz (1901): translation in three volumes
Oriental Tales: The Book of the Thousand Nights and One Night [and other tales]. (1901) verse and prose translation in 15 volumes, edited by Leonard C. Montesquieu Smithers
The Descent of the Dove and other poems (1902)
Poetical Works (1902) two volumes
Stories of Boccaccio (1903)
Vigil and Vision: New Sonnets (1903)
 Hamid the Luckless and other tales in verse (1904)
Songs of Consolation: New Poems (1904)
Sir Winfrith and other poems (1905)
Selections from the Poetry of John Payne (1906) selected by Tracy and Lucy Robinson
Flowers of France: Romantic Period (1906)
Flowers of France, The Renaissance Period (1907)
The Quatrains of Ibn et Tefrid (1908, second edition 1921)
Flowers of France: the Latter Days (1913)
Flowers of France: The Classic Period (1914)
The Way of the Winepress (1920)
Nature and Her Lover (1922)
The Autobiography of John Payne of Villon Society Fame, Poet and Scholar (1926)

See also
Thorgerda

Notes

External links 
 
 
 
 Arabian nights (Volume 1–13), translated by John Payne can be found online at the Internet Archive

1842 births
1916 deaths
English translators
Translators of One Thousand and One Nights
English male poets
19th-century British translators
19th-century English male writers
English male non-fiction writers